Tri-State Peak is a mountain located in the Cumberland Gap National Historical Park, near the "saddle" of the gap. It gets its name from being on the tripoint of the states of Kentucky, Tennessee, and Virginia.

The site also includes a marker denoting the location as being on the "Royal Colonial Boundary of 1665," which was marked by the American Society of Civil Engineers.

See also
Tri-state area

References

Borders of Kentucky
Borders of Tennessee
Borders of Virginia
Landforms of Bell County, Kentucky
Landforms of Claiborne County, Tennessee
Landforms of Lee County, Virginia
Border tripoints
Monuments and memorials in Kentucky
Monuments and memorials in Tennessee
Monuments and memorials in Virginia
Mountains of Kentucky
Mountains of Virginia
Mountains of Tennessee
East Tennessee
Eastern Kentucky Coalfield
Southwest Virginia